The La Mouette Skybike is a line of French paramotors that was designed and produced by La Mouette of Fontaine-lès-Dijon for powered paragliding.

Design and development
The aircraft was designed to comply with the US FAR 103 Ultralight Vehicles rules. It features a paraglider-style high-wing, single-place or two-place-in-tandem accommodation and a single engine in pusher configuration. As is the case with all paramotors, take-off and landing is accomplished by foot.

A three-wheeled tricycle unit was a factory option for all models that converts the paramotor into a powered parachute.

Variants
Skybike SR210
Base model, equipped with a  Solo 210 powerplant. An electric starter was a factory option. It sold for US$6,000 in 2001.
Skybike ZR250
Higher-powered model, equipped with a  Zenoah G-25 powerplant. An electric starter and after-muffler were factory options. It sold for US$6,000 in 2001.
Skybike ZR250 Bi
Higher-powered model for two place tandem flying, equipped with a  Zenoah G-25 powerplant. An electric starter and after-muffler were factory options. It sold for US$7,000 in 2001.

Specifications (SR210)

References

Skybike
1990s French ultralight aircraft
Single-engined pusher aircraft
Paramotors